The Electric may refer to:

Electric Slide, a four wall line dance
The Electric, Birmingham, the oldest running cinema in the UK
The Electric Blues Company, a backing band for former Animals keyboardist Alan Price
The Electric (band)